Rattus At The Roundhouse is a live DVD recording by The Stranglers of their concert at The Roundhouse, Camden, London on 4 November 2007. The performance was a song by song repeat of the same concert they played at the same venue, exactly 30 years ago to the day, with the addition of two more recent tracks ("Duchess" & "Spectre of Love") as the final encore.

Track listing 

 No More Heroes
 Ugly
 Bring on the Nubiles
 Dead Ringer
 Sometimes
 Dagenham Dave
 Goodbye Toulouse
 Hanging Around
 5 Minutes
 Bitching
 Burning up Time
 I Feel Like a Wog
 Straighten Out
 Something Better Change
 London Lady
 Peaches
 Grip
 Go Buddy Go
 Spectre of Love
 Duchess

2007 video albums
2007 live albums
Live video albums
The Stranglers live albums
The Stranglers video albums